is the twelfth single by L'Arc-en-Ciel. It was released simultaneously with "Honey" and "Shinshoku ~Lose Control~" on July 8, 1998. The song was used as the ending theme to TV Asahi's Shinsou Kyumei! Uwasa no Flie. The single debuted at number 4 on the Oricon chart. It was re-released on August 30, 2006. The single was also rerecorded by P'unk~en~ciel in 2012 as "花葬 平成十七年", in the album "P'unk is Not Dead".

Track listing

Kanji Meaning 
花, pronounced "ka", means "flower". 葬, pronounced "sou", means "burial" or "funeral"
Together, the kanji means "burial flowers"

References

1998 singles
L'Arc-en-Ciel songs
Songs about death
Songs written by Hyde (musician)
Songs written by Ken (musician)